The 2019 Brownlow Medal was the 92nd year the award was presented to the player adjudged the best and fairest player during the Australian Football League (AFL) home-and-away season. Nat Fyfe was the winner for the second time, with 33 votes.

Leading vote-getters

Voting procedure
The three field umpires (those umpires who control the flow of the game, as opposed to goal or boundary umpires) confer after each match and award three votes, two votes, and one vote to the players they regard as the best, second-best and third-best in the match, respectively. The votes are kept secret until the awards night, and they are read and tallied on the evening.

References

2019 Australian Football League season
2019